The Rio skate (Rioraja agassizii) is a shallow water skate native to the Atlantic coast of South America from Brazil to southern Argentina.  It is the only member of the monotypic genus Rioraja.

Named in honor of zoologist-geologist Louis Agassiz

References 

Rajidae
Taxa named by Johannes Peter Müller
Taxa named by Friedrich Gustav Jakob Henle
Fish described in 1841